Niña Bonita is a 1988 Venezuelan telenovela produced by Venevisión. It stars Ruddy Rodríguez in her first protagonist role and Luis Jose Santander.

Plot
A love triangle forms between Angela, Emilia and Francisco Leon, a young doctor.

Francisco is married to Emilia, but falls in love with Angela without knowing that they are related. Angela has been out of the country for three years, and before going to the capital to meet her family, she stops at Margarita Island where she casually meets Francisco who is there for a medical congress. Angela suffers a small accident while scuba diving, and Francisco comes to her aid. It is through this that they fall in love with each other. After a brief romance, they agree to meet each other, but they never do.

Angela goes to her parents' house where they have organized a welcome home party. When her sister Emilia introduces her to her husband, she discovers that it is Francisco.

Cast
 Ruddy Rodríguez ... Angela Santana
 Luis José Santander ... Francisco Antonio Leon
 Abril Méndez ... Emilia
 Henry Galue
 Martha Pabón ... Dra Virginia Lancaster
 Fernando Flores ... Aquiles  
 Raul Xiques ... Eligio Santana
 Eduardo Gadea Perez
 Ramon Hinojosa ... Filiberto
 Helianta Cruz ... Ana Elisa
 Francis Helen
 Laura Zerra ... Alcira
 Mirtha Borges ... Dolorita
 Betty Ruth ... Altagracia
 Chela D'Gar
 Jimmy Verdum
 Mauricio Gonzalez
 Jose Rubens
 Vicente Tepedino
 Carlos Subero
 Vilma Otazo ... Violeta
 Martha Pabon ... Virginia
 Hector Clotet
 Marcos Campos
 Juan Carlos Gardie
 Marisela Leandro
 Marilyn Sanchez
 Ricardo Montaner ... lawyer
 Ernesto Balzi ... Ernesto Martinez
 Eva Blanco

References

External links
 

1988 telenovelas
Venevisión telenovelas
Venezuelan telenovelas
1988 Venezuelan television series debuts
1988 Venezuelan television series endings
Spanish-language telenovelas
Television shows set in Venezuela